YHI International Limited  is an automotive, industrial automotive and industrial products distributor company based and headquartered in Singapore. It is also a name in alloy wheel manufacturing as an original design manufacturer (ODM) through "Advanti Racing" brand. The company founded and started in 1948 as sole proprietorship, by founder, the late Mr. Tay Chin Kiat.

Today, YHI has subsidiaries and associated companies located in Singapore, Malaysia, Thailand, Vietnam, China, Hong Kong, Taiwan, USA, Japan, Canada, Australia, New Zealand, the UAE and Italy. In addition, YHI has 5 manufacturing plants in Shanghai and Suzhou in China, Taoyuan in Taiwan and Sepang and Malacca in Malaysia.

Distributorship
The key tire brands currently the company carries are Yokohama, Nankang, Nexen, Pirelli, Nitto and Achilles. They also distribute various brands of alloy wheels namely - Advanti, Enkei, OZ, Konig and Breyton. For commercial industrial products, they represent Hitachi, and FIAM brands of industrial batteries and E-Z-GO golf buggies.

House Brand
They also have their own tire and battery under the "Neuton" brand. The tire's category reference as Neuton NT5000 (Ultra-High Performance tire), Neuton NT3000 (Commodity), Neuton X-Treme (SUV), Neuton LV1000 (Van) and Neuton K.O.O.L. (Winter/Snow).

Sponsorship
On 29 February 2008, YHI announced that they had entered into a supply lightweight racing wheels and sponsorship agreement with Formula 1 team Scuderia Toro Rosso S.p.A. ("STR") and O.Z. S.p.A. ("OZ") using their own house wheel brand called "Advanti Racing". The sponsorship involved total value of US$6 million over the three years.

References

External links
  

Manufacturing companies of Singapore
Companies listed on the Singapore Exchange